Kentucky Route 63 (KY 63) is a north–south state highway that traverses Monroe and Barren counties in south central Kentucky.

Route description
KY 63 starts at the Tennessee state line at the northern terminus of Tennessee State Route 56. Just north of that point is Gamaliel, where it intersects Bugtussle Road (KY 87 section 2), and begins its concurrency with KY 100. The two routes have intersections with KY 1860, and KY 1366 during the concurrency from Gamaliel to Tompkinsville. The two routes split at their junction with KY 163 in Tompkinsville.

KY 63 turns northwestward to the KY 678 junction at Mount Hermon. After entering Barren County, it meets KY 1324 at Temple Hill. KY 63 continues northwest to Glasgow, traversing the Louie B. Nunn Cumberland Parkway via an overpass. The route ends with U.S. 31E Business just south of the Barren County Courthouse. A few KY 63 trailblazer signs are posted in a few locations in that city.

Most of the KY 63 corridor is recognized as a Kentucky Scenic Byway, which signifies that KY 63 provides a scenic drive through most of its course in Monroe and Barren counties. Also, KY 63, along with the first  of KY 90 and parts of KY 70 between Mammoth Cave National Park and Cave City are parts of the "Cordell Hull Scenic Highway".

History 
Since 1986, KY 63 from Tompkinsville to Glasgow, along with KY 90 northwest of Glasgow, is the core route of the annual Roller Coaster Yard Sale.

Points of interest along the route
Barren County Fairgrounds, Temple Hill

Major intersections

References

External links

KY 63 at Kentucky Roads

 
0063
0063
0063